There are multiple notable buildings known as Ozanam House:

 Ozanam House, Ipswich in Queensland, Australia
 Ozanam House, Sydney in New South Wales, Australia